Map of the Past is the fifth studio album by progressive rock band It Bites. It was released on March 26, 2012. This is the band's first concept album. It was written by singer/guitarist John Mitchell and keyboardist John Beck throughout 2011. This concept deals with the theme of the past, as seen through old photographs.

Track listing 
"Man in the Photograph" (3:44)
"Wallflower" (4:51)
"Map of the Past" (4:37)
"Clocks" (5:43)
"Flag" (4:38)
"The Big Machine" (5:18)
"Cartoon Graveyard" (5:03)
"Send No Flowers" (4:15)
"Meadow and the Stream" (6:42)
"The Last Escape" (6:07)
"Exit Song" (1:43)

Bonus Tracks (2021 UK (& EU?) version) 

 Lighthouse (3:27)
"Come On" (5:10)

Also includes bonus 6-page 'Liner Notes' insert written by John Mitchell in January 2021.

Bonus Tracks  (Japanese special edition) 
"Come On" (5:10)

Bonus Disc Edition 
"Midnight" (live) (5:34) (2CD version)
"Bullet in the Barrel" (live) (4:43) (2CD version)
"Kiss Like Judas" (live) (6:32) (2CD version)
"Once Around The World" (live) (20:25) (2CD version)
"This is England" (live) (15:49) (2CD version)
"All in Red" (live) (3:57) (2CD version)

Personnel 
 John Mitchell - lead vocals, guitars
 John Beck - keyboards, backing & harmony vocals
 Lee Pomeroy - bass guitar
 Bob Dalton - drums, backing vocals

Charts

References

External links 
 Official site discography

2012 albums
It Bites albums
Inside Out Music albums
Concept albums